Events from the year 1683 in Denmark.

Incumbents
 Monarch – Christian V
 Grand Chancellor – Frederik Ahlefeldt

Events
 The Danish Code is officially completed, providing the first codification of Danish legislation. Some statutes are still active today.

Births

 Johan Cornelius Krieger, architect (d. 1755)

Deaths

16 March - Henrik Bjelke, admiral (born 1615).

Undated
 Jørgen Iversen Dyppel, governor (b. 1638)

References

 
Denmark
Years of the 17th century in Denmark